Khakim Kayumovich Fuzaylov (born 12 August 1964) is a Tajikistani professional football coach and a former player. He is the manager of Uzbek club Buxoro.

Career

Club
Fuzaylov made his professional debut in the Soviet First League in 1986 for Pamir Dushanbe. He played 1 game in the UEFA Cup 1993–94 for Lokomotiv Moscow.

Managerial
Fuzaylov started his managing career at FK Buxoro in 1998. In 2000–2002 he served as coach in FK Dinamo-Samarqand. From 2005 to 2011 he worked as scout coach in Rostov and Lokomotiv Moscow. In 2013 Fuzaylov was appointed by club as head coach of Lokomotiv Tashkent. Lokomotiv Tashkent leading by Fuzaylov finished 2013 season as runners-up after Bunyodkor. On 13 February 2014 he was fired from his post after Lokomotiv could not qualify to group stage of 2014 AFC Champions League.

Following Tajikistans failure to qualify for the 2019 Asian Cup, Fuzaylov resigned as manager.

On 3 December 2018, Fuzaylov was announced as the new manager of Istiklol. On 27 June 2019, Fuzaylov resigned as manager after Istiklol to progress from the group stages of the AFC Cup, with Alisher Tukhtaev being appointed as Caretaker Manager in his place.

On 23 December 2021, Fuzaylov left Dinamo Samarqand after getting them promoted back to the Uzbekistan Super League.

Personal life
Fuzaylov's younger brother Rahmatullo Fuzailov is also a professional footballer.

Career statistics

International

Statistics accurate as of 12 November 2015

International goals

Honours

Club
 Tajik League champion: 1992
 Russian Premier League bronze: 1994

Manager
 Uzbek League runners-up: 2013

References

1964 births
People from Khatlon Region
Living people
Soviet footballers
Tajikistani footballers
Tajikistan international footballers
Association football defenders
Vakhsh Qurghonteppa players
CSKA Pamir Dushanbe players
FC Lokomotiv Moscow players
FC Arsenal Tula players
Soviet Top League players
Soviet First League players
Soviet Second League players
Tajikistan Higher League players
Russian Premier League players
Russian Second League players
Tajikistani expatriate footballers
Expatriate footballers in Russia
Tajikistani expatriate sportspeople in Russia

Tajikistani football managers

FK Dinamo Samarqand managers
FK Andijan managers
PFC Lokomotiv Tashkent managers

Tajikistani expatriate football managers
Expatriate football managers in Uzbekistan
Tajikistani expatriate sportspeople in Uzbekistan
Expatriate football managers in Russia